Bandrele (sometimes spelled Bandrélé) is a commune in the French overseas department of Mayotte, in the Indian Ocean.

Geography

Climate

Bandrélé has a tropical savanna climate (Köppen climate classification Aw).

Villages
Dapani
Mtsamoudou

References

Populated places in Mayotte
Communes of Mayotte